Hystrichophora is a genus of moths belonging to the family Tortricidae.

Species
Hystrichophora asphodelana (Kearfott, 1907)
Hystrichophora decorosa Heinrich, 1929
Hystrichophora leonana Walsingham, 1879
Hystrichophora loricana (Grote, 1880)
Hystrichophora ochreicostana (Walsingham, 1884)
Hystrichophora ostentatrix Heinrich, 1923
Hystrichophora paradisiae Heinrich, 1923
Hystrichophora roessleri (Zeller, 1875)
Hystrichophora stygiana (Dyar, 1903)
Hystrichophora taleana (Grote, 1878)
Hystrichophora vestaliana (Zeller, 1875)

See also
List of Tortricidae genera

References

External links
tortricidae.com

Enarmoniini
Tortricidae genera